Jayant (born as Zakaria Khan; 15 October 1915 – 2 June 1975) was an Indian actor. He was the father of Amjad Khan and Imtiaz Khan. His notable works are in films like Amar, Memdidi and Nazneen. He worked in many movies with Dilip Kumar and Madhubala.

Early life
Jayant was born in Nodeh Payan (Nawan Kalli), Peshawar, North-West Frontier Province, British India on 15 October 1915 and was named Zakaria Khan. He was a Pashtun. He was only able to finish his elementary education. Jayant was a police officer in Alwar, Rajasthan before starting the film career.

Career
Jayant was tall and had a deep voice. He acted in many Indian films under his stage name Jayant. He worked in Vijay Bhatt's first Gujarati movie Sansaar Leela (1933). The name Jayant was also given to him by director and producer Vijay Bhatt. He played lead role in many movies like Bombay Mail (1935), Challenge (1936), His Highness (1937) and State Express (1938).

Personal life
Jayant was married and his children were Amjad Khan (of Gabbar Singh fame),  and Imtiaz Khan. He was the grandfather of Shadaab Khan, Ahlam Khan, Seemaab Khan and Ayesha Khan and father-in-law of Shaila Khan and Krutika Desai Khan (wife of Imtiaz).

Death
Jayant died on 2 June 1975 at age 60 in Bombay two months prior to the release of his son Amjad Khan's most successful movie Sholay. He died due to throat cancer. He was buried at Naupada Qabarstan of Bandra West in Mumbai.

Filmography

 Love and God (1986) as Emir-e-Basra
 Simon (1980) as Barundi
 Insaaniyat (1974) as Raghuveer / Diwan
 Mera Gaon Mera Desh  (1971) as Hawaldar Major Jaswant Singh
 Reshma Aur Shera  (1971) as Sagat Singh
 Heer Raanjha  (1970) as Chaudhary
 Maa Aur Mamta  (1970) as Qasim
 Aag Aur Daag  (1970) as Shyam
 Ek Nanhi Munni Ladki Thi  (1970)
 Inspector  (1970) as Marshal
 My Love (1970)
 Anmol Moti (1969)
 Do Raaste (1969) as Khan
 Sapnon Ka Saudagar (1968) as Thakur Rai Bahadur Harnam Singh
 Sunghursh (1968) as Bhavani Prasad
 Sagaai (1966) as Dwarkanath
 Thakur Jarnail Singh  (1966)
 Himalay Ki God Mein  (1965) as Lakhan Singh
 Sher Dil (1965)
 Beti Bete  (1964) as Raghu
 April Fool (1964) as Lal
 Haqeeqat (1964) as Brigadier Singh
 Leader  (1964) as Diwan Mahendranath
 Zindagi (1964) as Sher Khan
 Son of India (1962) as Jung Bahadur "J.B."
 Bada Aadmi (1961)
 Jhumroo (1961) as Dwarkanath
 Maya (1961) as Ranveer Dada
 Memdidi (1961) as Sher Mohammed Khan "Shera"
 Parakh  (1960) as Rai Bahadur Tandav Tarafdar
 Kal Hamara Hai  (1959) as Seth Heeralal
 Madhumati  (1958) as Pawan Raja
 Naya Andaz  (1956)
 Baap Re Baap (1955) as Raja Bahadur Moti Sagar
 Insaniyat  (1955) as Zangoora
 Musafir Khana  (1955)
 Tangewali  (1955)
 Yasmin  (1955)
 Amar  (1954) as Sankat Chhalia
 Watan (1954)
 Amar Kirtan  (1954)
 Rail Ka Dibba (1953)
 Nazneen (1951)
 Saiyan  (1951)
 Pardes (1950) as Rana Sahib
 Chaar Din (1949)
 Dulari (1949) as Girija Shankar
 Zevaraat (1949)
 Roop Nagar (1947)
 Maa Baap Ki Laaj (1946)
 Shirin Farhad (1945)
 Poonji (1943)
 Apni Nagariya (1940)
 Sardar (1940)
 Sardar-e-Awwal (1939)
 State Express (1938) as Prince
 Azad Veer (1936)
 Snehlata (1936)
 Bombay Mail (1935)
 Lal Chitta (1935)
 Bambai Ki Sethani (1935)
 Sansar Leela (1933)

References

External links
 

1915 births
1975 deaths
Pashtun people
Indian people of Pashtun descent
Male actors in Hindi cinema
20th-century Indian male actors
People from Peshawar